Maryam Tanveer Ali known by her stage name Maya Ali (born ), is a Pakistani actress. She made her debut with a brief role in telenovela Durr-e-Shehwar and later received praise for portraying the titular characters in Aik Nayee Cinderella and Aun Zara both (2012). Ali got her breakthrough for starring as Manahil Javed in Hum TV's romance Mann Mayal. In 2018 she made her film debut with Teefa In Trouble.

Ali received critical acclaim for her role of Zuleikha in the romantic dramality Mera Naam Yousuf Hai and Faarah Wali Khan in the ensemble family drama Diyar-e-Dil both (2015) these earned her the Lux Style Award for Best Television Actress. In 2019 she starred in the romantic-comedy Parey Hut Love for which she received two nominations at Lux Style Awards. Following a career downturn, in 2021 she did her comeback on television after 5 years with ARY Digital's romantic Pehli Si Muhabbat portraying Rakshi.

Life and career

Early life, career beginnings and breakthrough (1989–2015) 
Maya Ali was born as Maryam Tanveer Ali on 27 July 1989 in Lahore, Punjab, Pakistan, to Muslim parents. Her father, Tanveer Ali, was a businessman, and her mother, Shagufta Nazar, is a homemaker. She has one younger brother, Affnan. Ali completed her master's degree in mass communication from the Queen Mary College. Ali started her career at early age, working as a video jockey for the channels Samaa TV, Waqt News and Dunya News. According to Ali, her father was against her working in the entertainment industry and did not talk to her for six years, but she reconciled with him, before his death in 2016.

In 2012, She started off well with a brief role in drama Durr-e-Shehwar, telecasted on Hum TV. In this drama her name is Mahnoor. Her role is not very explanatory except that she is a younger sister of Durr-e-Shahwar (played by Sanam Baloch) and was born in a rich family and she always respects her elder sister. The drama was directed by Haissam Hussain and written by Umera Ahmed. Aik Nayee Cinderella was her next show after Durr-e-Shehwar telecasted on Geo TV and she got the lead role in this drama opposite Osman Khalid Butt and Faizan Khawaja. Maya's role in this serial was Meesha (cinderella). The serial is a modern retelling story of Cinderella and people were resembling it to Disney world stories. The serial was directed by Haissam Hussain and written by Faiza Iftikhar. After Aik Nayee Cinderella in 2013, she got the comedy project Aunn Zara, again under the direction of Haissam Hussain. The show is written by Faiza Iftikhar and was earlier titled as Hisar e Muhabbat. She played the role of Zara, opposite Osman Khalid Butt as her husband, Aunn. In 2013, Ali finally opted out from Haissam Hussain's direction to catch up with Ahsan Khan and Sohai Ali Abro for Khoya Khoya Chand, a romantic series which again was written by Faiza Iftikhar. She played the role of Ahmerin who is a loving and caring sister with a sweet nature.

In 2013, she starred as Hiba in Ranjish Hi Sahi. The show contains a much diversified story from usually stories, another project by A&B production which was ON-AIRED on Geo TV. It is full of tragedies, sorrows, sufferings and pain. Each and every character is very difficult to be played. Ali is yet again in a sisterly role but a possessive sister. Again in 2013, she did her another serial named Meri Zindagi Hai Tu which was on-aired on Geo TV. this serial was directed by Amin Iqbal, produced by A&B Entertainment and written by Faiza Iftikhar. The drama stars Ahsan Khan, her and Ayeza Khan in lead roles. The serial was first aired 20 September 2013 on Geo Entertainment, being aired on prime slot on Friday at 8:00 pm. The serial also aired on Indian channel Zindagi under the same title.

Her next project was Ladoon Mein Pali, alongside Sajal Aly and Affan Waheed. In this serial Ali is playing a leading role which is based on the story of a young girl her family. She played the role of Laraib, a girl whose family is traditional and respect their customs. This serial was aired on drama channel GEO TV at 8 pm every Tuesday. The story is written by Adam Aazeen and directed by Waseem Abbas. In 2014, Ali was cast in Shanakht, in which she played the role of Qurat-ul-Ain, who follows Islam but is criticized by her family and society. Ali also starred as Saman in Zid alongside Ahsan Khan. The series was directed by Adnan Wai Qureshi, while the story was written by Bee Gul, and was presented by Momina Duraid. Zid tells the story of an ambitious girl, named Saman, who is married to an American Pakistani man (played by Ahssan Khan) against her will. In 2015, Ali worked in Mehreen Jabbar's romantic drama Mera Naam Yousuf Hai. She played the role of Zulaikha, alongside Imran Abbas. That same year, she played the role of an estranged granddaughter Faarah Wali Khan in the blockbuster ensemble family drama Diyar-e-Dil, alongside Osman Khalid Butt, Abid Ali, Sanam Saeed, Mikaal Zulfiqar, Hareem Farooq and Ali Rehman Khan. The series was based on the novel of the same name by Farhat Ishtiaq, and was shot at the Khaplu Palace in Gilgit-Baltistan. For her performance in the series, she won the Hum Award for Best Actress Popular and received her first Lux Style Award for Best Actress nomination.

Established actress (2016–present)
In 2016, Ali starred as Manahil in Mann Mayal along with Hamza Ali Abbasi, Gohar Rasheed and Aisha Khan, for which she won Lux Style Award for Best Television Actress. It was co-created and co-produced by the creative head Momina Duraid with Sana Shahnawaz, Samina Humayun and Tariq Shah. The show was first aired on Hum TV, as a part of night programming all under Duraid's production company. The show was set in Hyderabad and Karachi, narrated the story of two neighbors from opposite background who fall in love with each other, but when he leaves the country to study, he falls for another woman. Mann Mayal premiered in Pakistan, UK, USA and UAE with same premier date and timings.

Ali then appeared in the romance Sanam, another Hum TV series, directed by Haseeb Hassan. Sanam had an ensemble cast, with Osman Khalid Butt as Harib, her as Aan, and Hareem Farooq as Ayla in leading roles. The story of serial was told in a heavily serialized manner and it follows a love triangle. It revolves around the journey of Harib, a successful businessman, as he discovers the difference between a life partner and a soulmate. The show was first aired on Hum TV, and was set in Karachi, Sindh. Sanam premiered in Pakistan, UK, USA and UAE with same premier date and timings. Series received generally positive reviews in its premier, however throughout its broadcast it received mixed to negative reviews where viewers and critics declared it as a drag.

In January 2017, she signed Ahsan Rahim's debut romantic action comedy film Teefa in Trouble (2018), as a co-star with Ali Zafar. Pre-production work began in 2016 when Zafar, Rahim and Danyal Zafar wrote the story and screenplay. Principal photography took place in Lahore and Warsaw between 18 February and 26 July 2017. Ali Zafar also created the music, while the film score was composed by Shani Arshad. The film released on 20 July 2018; it was distributed by Mandviwalla Entertainment and Geo Films nationwide. It is the first non-Indian film which was distributed internationally by Yash Raj Films. Critical reaction was largely positive and her performance of a Polish born rebellious daughter of a Don was particularly praised. Omair Alavi of Samaa wrote that Ali came as a "breath of fresh air and looks naturally beautiful", however, she "needs to work on her dialogue delivery but here it suited her character". OyeYeah thought that Ali has the "required energy" for the role and gets the acting, dancing part "right'. At the time of its release, it was one of the most expensive Pakistani films ever made. Trade journalists had high expectations for the film which ultimately became the third Pakistani film to cross the  mark, despite facing protests and film piracy afterwards.

Ali next played the role of a Turkey returned strong willed girl in the romantic comedy film Parey Hut Love (2019), directed by Asim Raza. The film, divided into four chapters, tells the story of an aspiring actor (played by Sheheryar Munawar) who falls in love with an already engaged girl (played by Ali). The film received positive reviews from critics, and Ali was praised for her performance. Fatima Awan of Reviewit thought that Ali "has given a really solid performance, her dialogue delivery and overall look is right on point." The Express Tribune took note of her performance and wrote that she "handles her character with maturity; [she] impresses the audience in almost every scene. Besides looking elegant." At the annual Lux Style Awards, she received two Best Actress nominations.

Ali made her comeback on television after five years in 2021, where she starred in the romantic Pehli Si Muhabbat; it marked her second collaboration with Sheheryar Munawar and fifth with Faiza Iftikhar. Directed by Anjum Shahzad, Pehli Si Muhabbat was acclaimed by the critics for its execution while criticized for the pacing, performances, screenplay and eventually became a major failures of 2021. Ali's performance listed in the worst performances of 2021 by Reviewit.pk. Wrote, "She fell from the expectations of the viewers. Her crying only gave headaches to the spectators and nothing else".

Later that year, Ali appeared as Sonia in historical drama Jo Bichar Gaye, which was based on true events from 1971 Indo-Pak War including the Fall of Dhaka, in her fourth collaboration with Haissam Hussain. The serial was criticality acclaimed but was a flop in terms of ratings.

She has signed her next project with Hum TV after six years last worked in Sanam which was failed to impress the audience. Since February 2023, she appeared as Kaneez Fatima in Yunhi opposite Bilal Ashraf in his television debut. It received mixed reviews from critics and audience.

Other work and media image
Ali is brand ambassador of Shaukat Khanum Memorial Cancer Hospital and Research Centre. Ali has visited different institutions to raise awareness of breast cancer among young girls. Maya Ali has recently launched her own clothing brand named MAYA Pret-A-Porter, which has become quite famous among masses in Pakistan. She hosted Eid special show, named Milan, on 7 February 2017. Ali is the brand ambassador of Quetta Gladiators in the Pakistan Super League. Ali had gotten her own customized  Shan e Pakistan jersey and was spotted wearing it as she was unveiled as the brand ambassador of the cricket team. On 19 April 2017, she and Ali Zafar performed at the sixteenth ceremony of the Lux Style Awards on Zafar's song "Ishq". Ali walks the ramp of Bridal Week 2018 as showstopper for Nomi Ansari. She always had a special preference for Nomi Ansari's designs and has been a brand ambassador for him for a few years now. 

She serves as an ambassador for a number of brands and products, such as Lux, QMobile, Sprite, Diva body spray and Royal fan. She has appeared as a guest on many television shows, including Sunrise from Istanbul, that was hosted by Maria Wasti in Turkey, The Afternoon Show with Yasir, Tonite with HSY and With Samina Peerzada. With over 7 million followers on Instagram, she is considered one of the most followed actresses in the country. In January 2021, the clothing brand, Alkaram Studio, announced Ali as the next Alkaram Woman for the year 2021.

Filmography

Films

Television

Awards and nominations

References

External links

 
 Maya Ali twitte

Living people
Pakistani female models
Pakistani television actresses
Pakistani film actresses
Punjabi people
21st-century Pakistani actresses
Actresses from Lahore
Queen Mary College, Lahore alumni
1989 births
Actresses in Urdu cinema
People from Lahore